The British Soap Award for Best British Soap is an award presented annually by the British Soap Awards. Alongside Best Leading Performer and Best Family, the award is voted for by the public. EastEnders is the most awarded soap in the category, with eleven wins. Doctors is the only current soap not to have won the award; defunct soaps that did not win are Brookside, Crossroads, Family Affairs and Night and Day. The award is currently held by Emmerdale.

Winners and nominees

Wins by soap

References

Soap opera awards
The British Soap Awards